Arona may refer to:


Places
 Arona, Piedmont, a town and commune in the Province of Novara, Italy
 Arona railway station
 Arona, Tenerife, a municipality in the Canary Islands, Spain
 Arona, Pennsylvania, United States, a borough
 Arona Parish, Latvia

Persons
 Arona Mané (born 1946), Senegalese Olympic wrestler
 Arone Teikatoara (died 1881), also spelled Arona, Mangareva prince regent
 Danilo Arona (born 1950), Italian writer
 Ricardo Arona (born 1978), Brazilian mixed martial artist
 Tinirau Arona (born 1989), New Zealand rugby league player

Other uses 
 SEAT Arona, a subcompact crossover SUV car model
 Arona (political party), a South African party active in Rustenburg Local Municipality
 Arona, A character in Blue Archive

See also
 Aronas, Greece